Dennis Murphy may refer to:

Dennis Murphy (Canadian politician) (1842–1917), Canadian businessman and political figure from Ontario
Dennis Murphy (equestrian) (born 1944), American Olympic equestrian
Dennis Murphy (journalist) (born 1946 or 1947), American television journalist
Dennis Murphy (motorcyclist) (born 1974), motorcyclist and rally navigator
Dennis Murphy (musician) (1934–2010), American composer, musician and artist
Dennis Murphy (rugby league), rugby league footballer of the 1940s for Bramley and Leeds (Heritage № 705)
Dennis Murphy (screenwriter) (1932–2005), American author and screenwriter
Dennis Murphy (sports entrepreneur) (1926–2021), co-founder of the World Hockey Association
Dennis Murphy (Wisconsin politician), 19th-century member of the Wisconsin State Senate and postmaster
Dennis A. Murphy (Massachusetts politician), member of the Massachusetts House of Representatives in 1911, and 1913–1918 
 the Dennis A. Murphy Trophy, presented to the WHA's best defenceman, was named after him
Dennis J. Murphy, United States Marine Corps general
Dennis M. Murphy, member of the Massachusetts House of Representatives from 1993 to 1999
 , American-French ice hockey player and coach

Denis Murphy may refer to:
Denis Murphy (Australian politician) (1936–1984), Australian Labor Party politician and historian
Denis Murphy (British politician) (born 1948), British Labour Party politician
Denis Murphy (Canadian politician) (1870–1949), lawyer, judge and politician from British Columbia, Canada
Denis Murphy (Carlow hurler) (born 1985), Irish hurler
Denis Murphy (Cork hurler) (born 1939), former Irish hurler
Denis Murphy (Irish musician) (1910–1974), Irish traditional musician from the Sliabh Luachra area
Denis Murphy (Medal of Honor) (1830–1901), Medal of Honor recipient
Denis Murphy (Tipperary hurler) (1901–1989), Irish hurler
Denis Brownell Murphy, Irish miniature painter